Mike D'Orso (born October 12, 1953) is an American author and journalist based in Norfolk, Virginia.

He wrote Like Judgment Day: The Ruin and Redemption of a Town Called Rosewood (1996), Plundering Paradise: The Hand of Man on the Galapagos Islands (2002), and Eagle Blue: A Team, A Tribe and a High School Basketball Season in Arctic Alaska (2006). His co-written books include Walking With the Wind: A Memoir of the Movement (1998), written with U.S. Congressman and former civil rights leader John Lewis; Rise and Walk: The Trial and Triumph of Dennis Byrd (1993), written with New York Jet defensive end Dennis Byrd; and Oceana: Our Endangered Oceans and What We Can Do to Save Them (2011), written with actor and environmental activist Ted Danson.

Life
D'Orso's father was a U.S. Navy submarine officer and a graduate of the U.S. Naval Academy. D'Orso was born in Portsmouth, Virginia, and was raised in military base cities, including: Key West, Florida; San Diego, California; Charleston, South Carolina; and Frankfurt, Germany. He graduated with a degree in philosophy from the College of William and Mary in 1975 and earned a master's degree in English from William and Mary in 1981.

D'Orso was a staff writer for Commonwealth Magazine (1981-1984), features writer for The Virginian-Pilot (1984-1993), and contributor to Sports Illustrated magazine (1988-1993). Seven of his books have been best sellers: Rosewood: Like Judgment Day and Body For Life (both The New York Times); Walking With the Wind (The Los Angeles Times and The Washington Post); Like No Other Time and In Praise of Public Life (The Washington Post); Rise and Walk (Bookstore Journal National Christian Bestsellers); and Winning With Integrity (Business Week). Walking With the Wind also won the 1999 Robert F. Kennedy Book Award and was selected for Newsweek magazine's 2009 list of "50 Books For Our Times".

Works
D'Orso's work often involves issues of social justice. His first book, Somerset Homecoming (1988), written with Dorothy Redford, was about Redford's investigation into her ancestors' experience as slaves in North Carolina.

Like Judgment Day discussed the 1923 Rosewood massacre, and the survivors' pursuit of reparations seventy years later.

Walking With the Wind was a biography of John Lewis, a leader of the civil rights movement during the 1960s.

Eagle Blue was about rural Native American villagers in arctic Alaska shifting from a subsistence lifestyle of hunting, trapping and fishing to a modern cash economy.

Plundering Paradise described the social and environmental impact of thousands of Ecuadorians moving to the Galapagos Islands in search of jobs.

References

External links
 D'Orso's website

1953 births
Living people
American male journalists
20th-century American writers
21st-century American non-fiction writers
People from Portsmouth, Virginia
Writers from Virginia
College of William & Mary alumni
Journalists from Virginia
21st-century American male writers